The orchard oriole (Icterus spurius) is the smallest species of icterid. The subspecies of the Caribbean coast of Mexico, I. s. fuertesi, is sometimes considered a separate species, the ochre oriole or Fuertes's oriole.

Description

Measurements:

 Length: 5.9-7.1 in (15-18 cm)
 Weight: 0.6-1.0 oz (16-28 g)
 Wingspan: 9.8 in (25 cm)

The bill is pointed and black with some blue-gray at the base of the lower mandible (Howell and Webb 1995). The adult male of the nominate subspecies has chestnut on the underparts, shoulder, and rump, with the rest of the plumage black. In the subspecies I. s. fuertesi, the chestnut is replaced with ochre (Howell and Webb 1995). The adult female and the juvenile of both subspecies have olive-green on the upper parts and yellowish on the breast and belly. All adults have pointed bills and white wing bars. (Orchard orioles are considered to be adults after their second year.) One-year-old males are yellow-greenish with a black bib.

Habitat and range
The breeding habitat is semi-open areas with deciduous trees. I. s. spurius breeds in spring across eastern North America from near the Canada–United States border south to central Mexico. A 2009 study also found breeding in the thorn forest of Baja California Sur and the coast of Sinaloa during the summer "monsoon"; this region had previously been thought to be only a migratory stopover (Rohwer, Hobson, and Rohwer, 2009). I. s. fuertesi breeds from southern Tamaulipas to Veracruz (Howell and Webb 1995). These birds enjoy living in shaded trees within parks along lakes and streams. The nest is a tightly woven pouch attached to a fork on a horizontal branch. Their nests tend to sit close together.

The nominate subspecies' winter range extends from the coastal lowlands of central Sinaloa and southern Veracruz south to northern Colombia and northwestern Venezuela (Scharf and Kren 1996). The ochre subspecies has been observed in winter on the Pacific slope of Mexico (Howell and Webb 1995).

Nominate orchard orioles depart from their winter habitats in March and April and arrive in their breeding habitats from late April to late May. Usually, they leave their breeding territories in late July and early August and arrive on their winter territories in mid August. These birds are nocturnal migrants.

Diet
While in breeding season, they eat insects and spiders. When the season changes, their diet also includes ripe fruit, which quickly passes through their digestive tract. During the winter, their diet consists of fruit, nectar, insects and seeds.

Behavior
When in flight, orchard orioles generally swoop close to the ground and fly at or below treetop level.

During courtship, females display themselves in three ways. The first is by bowing their head and torso toward the male. Seesawing, the second courtship display, involves repetitively alternating lowering and raising the head and tail. The third display is begging, which is fast-paced fluttering of wings halfway extended, followed by a high whistle.

Etymology
The specific name spurius refers to the original misidentification of the male as a female Baltimore oriole. These birds are sometimes mistakenly identified as New World warblers.

References

 Foster, Mercedes S. (2007): The potential of fruiting trees to enhance converted habitats for migrating birds in southern Mexico. Bird Conservation International 17(1): 45–61.  PDF full text
 Hilty, Steven L. (2003): Birds of Venezuela. Christopher Helm, London. 
 Rohwer, Sievert, Hobson, Keith A., & Rohwer, Vanya (2009): Migratory double breeding in Neotropical migrant birds. Proceedings of the National Academy of Sciences on line.  Abstract, PDF full text (subscription required)
 Scharf, William C. & Kren, Josef (1996). Orchard Oriole (Icterus spurius), The Birds of North America Online (A. Poole, Ed.). Ithaca: Cornell Lab of Ornithology; Retrieved from the Birds of North America Online: full text (subscription required)
 Stiles, F. Gary & Skutch, Alexander Frank (1989): A guide to the birds of Costa Rica. Comistock, Ithaca.

External links

 Orchard oriole - Cornell Lab of Ornithology
 Orchard oriole - Icterus spurius - USGS Patuxent Bird Identification InfoCenter
 
 
 Orchard oriole sound at Florida Museum of Natural History

orchard oriole
orchard oriole
Native birds of the Eastern United States
Birds of Mexico
Birds of the Caribbean
orchard oriole
Taxa named by Carl Linnaeus